The Avivim school bus bombing was a terrorist attack on an Israeli school bus on 22 May 1970, in which 12 civilians were killed, nine of them children, and 25 were wounded, one of whom died of a wound sustained in the attack 44 years later. The attack took place on the road to Moshav Avivim, near Israel's border with Lebanon. Two rocket-propelled grenades (RPGs) were fired at the bus. The attack was one of the first carried out by the PFLP-GC.

Attack 
Early in the morning, the bus departed from Avivim heading with its passengers to two local schools. This route had been scouted by the terrorists, believed to have infiltrated from Lebanon, and an ambush was set up. As the bus passed by, ten minutes after leaving Avivim, it was attacked by heavy gunfire from both sides of the road. The driver was among those hit in the initial barrage, as were the two other adults on board. The three were killed as the bus crashed into an embankment as the attackers continued firing into the vehicle.

The attackers were never apprehended.

Fatalities
The children, who were in first to third grade, were buried in a special plot in Safed. A monument commemorating the victims of the attack stands in the middle of the moshav.

Leah Revivo, who survived the attack at age nine, died in 2014 at age 52 from an infection brought on by a piece of shrapnel lodged in her brain as a result of the attack.

Aftermath
Israel retaliated for the massacre by shelling four Lebanese villages, killing 20 people, injuring 40, and spurring thousands of southern Lebanon's residents to flee north.  This in turn provided one of the motivations for the Dawson's Field hijackings of 6 September 1970. The IDF also began patrolling regularly inside southern Lebanon after the massacre.

See also
List of massacres in Israel

References 

Mass murder in 1970
Terrorist incidents in Asia in 1970
Attacks on buses by Palestinian militant groups
School killings in Israel
Mass shootings in Israel
Massacres in Israel
Palestinian terrorism
School massacres
Massacres in Israel during the Israeli–Palestinian conflict
Murdered Israeli children
May 1970 events in Asia
1970 mass shootings in Asia
1970 murders in Israel
Terrorist incidents in Israel in the 1970s
Explosions in 1970
Massacres in 1970